Radinghem-en-Weppes is a commune in the Nord department in northern France.

Heraldry

See also
Communes of the Nord department

References

Radinghemenweppes
French Flanders